Noelene Rae Horne (née Swinton; born 1933) is a former New Zealand high jumper.

At the 1950 British Empire Games she won the bronze medal in the women's high jump. At the following 1954 British Empire and Commonwealth Games she placed 5th in the high jump.

In 1959, she married Valentine Arthur Horne, who served as manager of the New Zealand badminton team at the 1966 British Empire and Commonwealth Games. The couple went on to have six children, including cricketer Matt Horne, and Phil Horne, who represented New Zealand in both badminton and cricket.

References

External links 
 Profile at trackfield.brinkster.net
 

New Zealand female high jumpers
Commonwealth Games bronze medallists for New Zealand
Athletes (track and field) at the 1950 British Empire Games
Athletes (track and field) at the 1954 British Empire and Commonwealth Games
Commonwealth Games medallists in athletics
1933 births
Living people
Medallists at the 1950 British Empire Games